Hyloxalus marmoreoventris is a species of frogs in the family Dendrobatidae. It is endemic to Ecuador and only known from its type locality on the eastern slope of the Andes in the Tungurahua Province. It is a little known species which possibly has not been observed after it was first described.

Description
The holotype, a male, measures  in snout–vent length and has a spotted venter (which distinguishes it from the similar Hyloxalus fallax). Females are unknown.

Habitat and conservation
Hyloxalus marmoreoventris inhabits premontane forest at  asl. It is threatened by habitat loss. The forest at the type locality has already been cleared, although forests remain in the vicinity and within protected areas (Llanganates and Sangay National Parks).

References

marmoreoventris
Amphibians of the Andes
Amphibians of Ecuador
Endemic fauna of Ecuador
Amphibians described in 1991
Taxonomy articles created by Polbot